The First Congregational Church of Hyde Park, now the Hyde Park Seventh-day Adventist Church, is a historic Congregational church at 6 Webster Street in the Hyde Park neighborhood of Boston, Massachusetts. It was designed by the Boston architectural firm of Kilham & Hopkins, with stained glass by Charles Connick.  It is a fine local example of Gothic Revival architecture, built for Hyde Park's second-oldest congregation (established 1860) in 1910.

The church was listed on the National Register of Historic Places in 1999.

It is now used by the Hyde Park Seventh-day Adventist Church. The SDA church purchased the property in 2007. On December 15, 2007, the day of the church's dedication, there were 304 members

See also 
National Register of Historic Places listings in southern Boston, Massachusetts

References

External links

Churches in Boston
Churches on the National Register of Historic Places in Massachusetts
Stone churches in Massachusetts
Hyde Park, Boston
National Register of Historic Places in Boston
Congregational churches in Massachusetts